Holysloot is a village in the Dutch province of North Holland. It is a part of the municipality of Amsterdam, and lies about 9 km northeast of the city centre. The name Holysloot probably derives from an expression for a "low-lying area at a ditch".

Holysloot is a part of the deelgemeente (sub-municipality) Amsterdam-Noord. The village has about 160 inhabitants.

Holysloot was a separate municipality between 1 May 1817 and 1 January 1818, when it was merged with Ransdorp.

References

Populated places in North Holland
Former municipalities of North Holland
Geography of Amsterdam
Amsterdam-Noord